The MacFarlane River is a river in Unorganized Kenora District in northwestern Ontario, Canada and a tributary of the Winnipeg River.
Locally it has been called the "Black River", a reference to the dark tannin stained water.

Course
The MacFarlane River begins at Rocky Lake and heads southwest reaching Bluff Lake and the unincorporated place of Brinka. It continues southwest to Grindstone Lake, where it takes in the left tributary Boot Creek, then to Basket Lake and the community of Redditt. The river continues southwest to Corn Lake, where it takes in the left tributary Talbot Creek, passes out, takes in the left tributary Whitney Creek and reaches Ena Lake, where it takes in the right tributary Octopus Creek. It continues southwest over a control dam, and reaches its mouth at the Winnipeg River. For almost the entire course, the river is paralleled by the Canadian National Railway transcontinental main line,

Tributaries
Octopus Creek (right)
Whitney Creek (left)
Talbot Creek (left)
Boot Creek (left)

Lakes
Ena Lake
Corn Lake
Basket Lake
Grindstone Lake
Bluff Lake
Hall Lake
Rocky Lake

Communities
Ena Lake
Redditt
Brinka

See also
List of rivers of Ontario

References

Sources

Rivers of Kenora District
Tributaries of Hudson Bay